Nizhniye Bishindy (Tübänge Bişende) is a rural locality (a selo) in Verkhnebishindinsky Selsoviet, Tuymazinsky District, Bashkortostan, Russia. The population was 744 as of 2010. There are 9 streets.

Geography 
Nizhniye Bishindy is located 14 km south of Tuymazy (the district's administrative centre) by road. Verkhniye Bishindy is the nearest rural locality.

References 

Rural localities in Tuymazinsky District